Five Paupers in an Automobile is a 1952 Italian comedy film directed by Mario Mattoli and starring Eduardo De Filippo.

Cast
 Eduardo De Filippo as Eduardo Moschettone
 Aldo Fabrizi as Cesare Baroni
 Titina De Filippo as Mariù Palombella
 Walter Chiari as Paolo
 Isa Barzizza as Cicci
 Hélène Rémy as Gina
 Luigi Cimara as Le placier
 Aldo Giuffré as Padella 
 Arnoldo Foà as Alfredo 
 Gianni Cavalieri as Gino Pranzi 
 Carlo Romano as Rodolfo 
 Nando Bruno as Battista 
 Mario Pisu as Titolare dell'autosalone 
 Raimondo Vianello as Maggiordomo 
 Alberto Talegalli as Clemente 
 Alberto Sorrentino as Padre ansioso 
 Enzo Garinei as Cameriere 
 Mario Feliciani as Parrucchiere 
 Luigi Cimara as Investito 
 Giulio Calì as Stalliere 
 Mario Castellani as Regista
 Silvana Jachino as La segretaria del salone auto
 Gina Mascetti as La barista

References

External links

1952 films
1952 comedy-drama films
Italian comedy-drama films
1950s Italian-language films
Italian black-and-white films
Films set in Rome
Films directed by Mario Mattoli
Films with screenplays by Cesare Zavattini
Films with screenplays by Mario Amendola
1950s Italian films